Myoporum rapense is a plant in the figwort family, Scrophulariaceae and is endemic to French Polynesia and the Kermadec Islands. It is closely related to Myoporum laetum and there are two subspecies which are found on different island groups.

Description

The tube is white, usually spotted pale purple and is hairy inside and on the inner parts of the lobes. There are four stamens which extend beyond the petal tube. Flowers are usually present throughout the year and are followed by the fruit which is an oval-shaped, red, mauve or sometimes white drupe.

Taxonomy
Myoporum rapense was first formally described in 1935 by Forest B. H. Brown and the description was published in Bernice P. Bishop Museum Bulletin. The specific epithet  rapense refers to Rapa Island where the type specimen was collected by W.R.Sykes.

There are two subspecies:
Myoproum rapense  F.Br.  subsp. rapense which has smooth leaves and red fruit and occurs on Raivavae, Rapa and Tubuai islands in the Austral Islands of French Polynesia;
Myoporum rapense subsp. kermadecense  (W.R.Sykes) Chinnock  which has leaves that have oil dots in the leaves and violet, purple or white fruits and occurs on islands in the Kermadec group.

Distribution and habitat
Myoporum rapense is found on the Austral and Kermadec Islands where it grows in coastal scrub, woodland, sand dunes or volcanic soils often on rocky hillsides.

Conservation
Myoporum rapense is listed as being of "least concern" in the IUCN Red List.

References

Flora of the Kermadec Islands
Flora of French Polynesia
Least concern plants
rapense
Plants described in 1935
Taxonomy articles created by Polbot
Taxa named by Forest B.H. Brown